Félicie is a play by the French playwright Pierre de Marivaux. It was published for the first time in the Mercure de France in March 1757. 

It portrays the education and discipline of a young girl experiencing passionate love, who was stopped just in time by a fairy before her passion could get out of hand. However, Pierre de Marivaux did not submit this as a theatrical piece. It was thought that the dialogue in the piece would be less likely to earn aesthetic appreciation and approval than if it were left to literary expression.

Characters 
 Félicie
 Lucidor
 La Fée, the Fairy, under the name of Hortense
 La Modestie, Modesty
 Diane
 Troupe de chasseurs, Troop of Hunters

Synopsis 
In a wonderland, a young girl, Félicie, is raised by a fairy. Her godmother can make her a gift, of her choice. Félicie chooses the gift of pleasing. The fairy grants her wish.

Plays by Pierre de Marivaux